The Dallara DP01 is a second-generation Daytona Prototype race car, designed, developed and built by Italian manufacturer Dallara, for the Grand-Am Rolex Sports Car Series, in 2008. It was powered by a number of different engines, including Pontiac, Chevrolet, and Ford V8 engines, and even a Ford EcoBoost V6 engine.

References

2000s cars
Mid-engined cars
Rear-wheel-drive vehicles
Sports prototypes
Dallara racing cars